Indoctrination is the process of inculcating a person with ideas, attitudes, cognitive strategies or professional methodologies (see doctrine).

Humans are a social animal species inescapably shaped by cultural context, and thus some degree of indoctrination is implicit in the parent–child relationship, and has an essential function in forming stable communities of shared values, and thus should not be regarded as harmful, and is probably good or prosocial.

The precise boundary between education and indoctrination often lies in the eye of the beholder. Some distinguish indoctrination from education on the basis that the indoctrinated person is expected not to question or critically examine the doctrine they have learned. As such the term may be used pejoratively or as a buzz word, often in the context of political opinions, theology, religious dogma or anti-religious convictions. The word itself came about in its first form in the 1620s as 
endoctrinate, meaning to teach or to instruct, and was modeled from French or Latin. The word only gained the meaning of imbuing with an idea or opinion in the 1830s.

The term is closely linked to socialization; however, in common discourse, indoctrination is often associated with negative connotations, while socialization functions as a generic descriptor conveying no specific value or connotation (some choosing to hear socialization as an inherently positive and necessary contribution to social order, others choosing to hear socialization as primarily an instrument of social oppression). Matters of doctrine (and indoctrination) have been contentious and divisive in human society dating back to antiquity. The expression attributed to Titus Lucretius Carus in the first century BCE quod ali cibus est aliis fuat acre venenum (what is food to one, is to others bitter poison) remains pertinent.

Political context

In the political context, indoctrination is often analyzed as a tool of class warfare, where institutions of the state are identified as "conspiring" to maintain the status quo. Specifically the public educational system, the police, and mental health establishment are a commonly cited modus operandi of public pacification. In the extreme, an entire state can be implicated. George Orwell's book Nineteen Eighty-Four famously singled out explicit, state-mandated propaganda initiatives of totalitarian regimes. Opinions differ on whether other forms of government are less doctrinaire, or merely achieve the same ends through less obvious methods.

Religious context
Religious indoctrination, the original sense of indoctrination, refers to a process of imparting doctrine in an authoritative way, as in catechism. Most religious groups among the revealed religions instruct new members in the principles of the religion; this is now not usually referred to as indoctrination by the religions themselves, in part because of the negative connotations the word has acquired. Mystery religions require a period of indoctrination before granting access to esoteric knowledge. (cf. Information security)
As a pejorative term, indoctrination implies forcibly or coercively causing people to act and think on the basis of a certain ideology. Some secular critics believe that all religions indoctrinate their adherents, as children, and the accusation is made in the case of religious extremism. Sects such as Scientology use personality tests and peer pressures to indoctrinate new members. Some religions have commitment ceremonies for children 13 years and younger, such as Bar Mitzvah, Confirmation, and Shichi-Go-San. In Buddhism, temple boys are encouraged to follow the faith while young. Some critics of religion, such as Richard Dawkins, maintain that the children of religious parents are often unfairly indoctrinated.

However, indoctrination can occur, and often does occur with great frequency, in non-religious or anti-religious contexts. For example, in the 20th century, the former People's Socialist Republic of Albania and the former USSR instituted programs of government-sponsored atheistic indoctrination in order to promote state atheism, specifically Marxist–Leninist atheism, within their citizenry. Sabrina P. Ramet, a professor of political science, documented that "from kindergarten onward children [were] indoctrinated with an aggressive form of atheism" and "to denounce parents who follow religious practices at home." However, after the death of Albania's leader, Enver Hoxha in 1985, his successor, Ramiz Alia, adopted a relatively tolerant stance toward religious practice, referring to it as "a personal and family matter." Émigré clergymen were permitted to reenter the country in 1988 and officiate at religious services. Mother Teresa, an ethnic Albanian, visited Tirana in 1989, where she was received by the foreign minister and by Hoxha's widow. In December 1990, the ban on religious observance was officially lifted, in time to allow thousands of Christians to attend Christmas services (see Freedom of religion in Albania).

Similarly, in the former Soviet Union, "science education [in] Soviet schools [was] used as a vehicle for atheistic indoctrination", with teachers being instructed to prepare their course "so as to conduct anti-religious educations at all times," in order to comport with state-sanctioned Marxist–Leninist values. However, in 1997, several years after the fall of the Soviet Union, the Russian government passed a law recognizing religion as being important to Russian history with Orthodox Christianity (Russian: Православие Pravoslaviye), Russia's traditional and largest religion, declared a part of Russia's "historical heritage."

Military

The initial psychological preparation of soldiers during training is referred to (non-pejoratively) as indoctrination.

Information security
In the field of information security, indoctrination is the initial briefing and instructions given before a person is granted access to secret information.

See also

 Acculturation
 Behavior modification
 Brainwashing
 Ideology
 Pensée unique
 Recruitment
 Ruscism
 Groupthink

References

External links

Habermas and the Problem of Indoctrination  Encyclopedia of Philosophy of Education

Propaganda techniques
Social influence